Valdelaguna is a Spanish town in the province of Madrid. It is located southeast of the district, in Las Vegas region, 49 km from Madrid city.
It is bordered by the towns of Chinchón, Belmonte de Tajo, Villarejo de Salvanés, Perales de Tajuña, Morata de Tajuña and Colmenar de Oreja. It covers an area of 41.89 km ², has an average altitude of 702 m and the adjective of its inhabitants is Abubillo / a. (Valdelaguneros).

Population 
 867 inhabitants (2017). Farming and ranching are still present in the city's economy, finding pig and sheep farms and vineyards and olive crops mainly. The presence of cereal crops such as corn and sunflower is marginal. There are quarries of limestone and gypsum but still the development of the industrial sector is not particularly relevant in the municipality. Production of cheese, wine and pork for family businesses. The construction phenomenon is present in some years now because of the proximity of Madrid. This means a more dynamic economic activity by creating new jobs but most of the new inhabitants must travel to work. 3 bars, 2 lodgings and stores traditional staples and complete the panorama Valdelaguna economic sector.

Sights 
The town sees its traditional buildings disappear, made by stone, clay and gypsum, which are replaced by modern buildings, comfortable and graceless. Without entirely losing its charm because of the views that we provide the slopes that cover the hillsides where this village is, the steep streets of this town offer the odd place with some interest.

  'Assumption Church is a canonically oriented temple, built in several phases and irregular ground, halfway between a basilica with chapels and cross plan. The exterior is plastered in white except in ashlar masonry corners and socket. In the area of the tower, completely built in 2002 with brick, plinth corners and decorative plates are coated with Colmenar stone.

The header and cruise abroad have a cornice with corbels profile nacelle and a semicircular apse, on the inside, this space has an irregular structure pointed and fresco decoration in the apse, representing Tetramorph Pantocrator in Romanesque iconography. This part of the building has been dated to the second half of the 15th century. Between the cruise ship and the main vault, there is a large arch of the 18th century, as are the four sections of barrel vault with lunettes covering the nave.

On the right flank of the temple a space runs parallel to the main nave, only communicates with it in the transept by a round arch and toes with a lintel that opens under the choir. On the left side of the wall about two-thirds are occupied by three arches that communicate with two chapels, linked these together without actually forming a kind of aisle. One of these chapels, in the transept, opens with a roundarch, the other communicates with the nave in the middle of the wall by two pointed arches supported by an interesting and plain shaft column capitals with volutes rough. The remaining third of the left flank, to toe the ship opens to the outside forming an atrium with 3 slender lintels and Tuscan columns with footings and beams. Under this court found the greatest access to the temple, a flat arch with recess sores from the 18th century, in the key reads "Ave Maria. Year 1766". Along the eaves of the same court is an old sundial undated.

At the foot of the church is the choir with wooden beams and, outside, the tower stands on a door arch. In the center of this facade a niche houses a stone sculpture of the Virgen de la Blanca.

After the Civil War the church was drastically restored by the National Regions Devastated by architect Javier Barroso, then reopened the atrium, which had been built in an area that housed a Catholic school.

In 2002, in an even more drastic intervention, was completely demolished and rebuilt the tower, a section of the dome, the choir and reusing much of the original features atrium, although major structural modifications were introduced.
  'Casa del Cura: so named because it is currently the rectory. Masonry building with ashlar in plinth and corners and stepped cornice with bricks. Its focus is on the entrance, consists of a round arch with ashlar and recess sores, a triangular pediment surmounted by herrerian balls at its vertices. The blazon of the key witnesses to the origin arc lineage Quiñones de Benavente in this villa. The building houses an archive of great interest for the study of the history of the municipality. It is tradition that the house belonged to Manuel Godoy, although there is no documentation to prove it.
  'Casa Grande: Built in phases around a central courtyard on a level such that one of its facades presents a high above the village, this facade is ashlar masonry at the corners and socket. Presents a very disturbed due to the large number of openings that have been practiced over time. In the courtyard, two floors, wooden beams note pads inserted in the wall, which originally may have formed arcades and galleries corrala mode. There are several theories about the origin of the building but none of them are proven, could be the hospice existed in the village in the 16th century, as was in the Relaciones Topográficas de Felipe II. The tradition tells it was the chivalry of the Casa del Cura. In the Catastro de Ensenada cited a house "high living", which was to be the Big House because of the volume and height of the building. It was renovated in 1739 according to the inscription on the keystone lintel of the main entrance. Currently occupied by several private homes. Here you can visit a charming wine museum.
  'Old wash or "Fuente Arriba", recently unearthed, has four batteries, each for a particular purpose: to supply people, cattle trough, rinse clothes and laundry. Curious above the pipes the little monument built in Francoist Spain, surmounted by a pediment which reads "Work dignifies women" and flanked by two female figures, each with its jug, they tell us very clearly what kind of work is supposed to dignify women.
  'Square and City Hall: the work of architects and Carlos Victor Lopez Cotelo Bridge, built in 1986 was awarded the College of Architects of Madrid. Perhaps the best building in the town.

The town is nestled in a small valley leading to the river valley Tajuña, surrounded by rolling hills that produce rounded rugged landscape but embraceable something for everyone. Among progressive farmland abandonment in unevenly distributed olives, vines, orchards and fields, we find small fountains in pleasant places and occasional forests of Mediterranean forest of Aleppo pine reforestation. There are two hiking trails, the "Ruta de la Vega" and "Ruta de las fuentes", well marked, but careful during hunting season, and if what is sought are gentle slopes, the greenway "Del páramo a la vega" going from Chinchón to Morata de Tajuña, runs largely by the end of the municipality.

 History 
In the first documentary record of the municipality, dated February 4, 1156, Alfonso VII donated to the Church of San Ginés in Madrid and his prior, Salvanés villa (Villarejo de Salvanés), granting manorial right over the territory which included among others the term  Val de la Laguna. Later, in 1190, appears in the Transierra integrated, between Segovia lands in the south of the Central System, in the sexmo of Valdemoro. In 1480 the Catholic Monarchs include this sexmo in the lordship of Chinchón, obtaining also the title of Villa by the hands of monarchs. The municipality remains bound to this manor later, when converted into County Chinchón.

Valdelaguna appears in the Relaciones Topográficas de Felipe II, in 1580 which is recorded the existence of the lake that gives the town its name, "the royal road to Perales Valdelaguna there a meadow and in it a very good water spring where is a lagoon, in winter it runs to the Tajuña river. " This lake was drained afterward from malarial fevers caused their water scarce in the population. In these same Relaciones... said the village has 98 households and neighbors 100–103. They cite five chapels: St. Stephen, the oldest, San Sebastian and San Roque erected on the occasion of epidemics and pestilences, the Magdalena, half a league from the town, next to Tajuña, where they used to go in procession litanies, and Santo Toribio, included those currently in the cemetery.

There are documents that tell the people suffered looting in the War of the Spanish Succession by the troops of the Archduke Charles, which was destroyed the archive that the town possessed. In 1785 when answering the questionnaire sent by the Cardinal Lorenzana population has 361 inhabitants and, in addition to agriculture, there are some common canvas looms hemp, which means the appearance of the guild of craftsmen .

In the 19th century, with the abolition of primogeniture and the division into provinces in 1833, the town is built in the province of Madrid and passes Chinchón County rely on Judicial District of the same name. In his Dictionary, Madoz counted 464 inhabitants and speak from two sources that supply water to the people of good quality, jail and primary school education.

With the 20th century continued growth in the population. During the Civil War the term, characterized by hills and ravines, becomes war front and the Church is sacked. In 1960, 946 persons were counted, the largest demographic development so far. The growing influence of Madrid and the phenomenon of property bubble in Spain, have led to a significant urban development and infrastructure to the detriment of the natural environment and cultural heritage of the municipality.

In Valdelaguna born on V.P. Miguel de la Fuente, 16th century mystic writer, painter of the 19th century Ventura Miera and in 1911 the filmmaker Antonio del Amo, chief among other popular films of Joselito.

 References Arquitectura y desarrollo urbano: Comunidad de Madrid: Zona Sur. Volumen 13. Amalia Castro-Rial Garrone. Madrid. Consejería de Obras Públicas, Urbanismo y Transportes, 2004. La teatralización de la historia en el Siglo de Oro Español. Castilla Pérez R., González Dengra M. Universidad de Granada, p. 35. 2001. Relaciones Topográficas de Felipe II:Relaciones Inéditas de la Provincia de Madrid. Hernando Ortego, Francisco Javier. de la Hoz Garcia, Carlos. Instituto de Estudios Madrileños, 1987 Nobiliario genealógico de los títulos y reyes de España. Volumen I. López de Haro, Alonso. Madrid. 1632. pp. 597–600 (by mistake says 397–400). Enciclopedia del Románico en España. El románico en Madrid. Nuño González, Jaime (director). pp. 505–508. 2009. Historia de Madrid y de los pueblos de su provincia. Ortega Rubio, Juan. Imprenta Municipal. Madrid, 1921. Boletín de la Academia Nacional de la Historia'''''. Tomo XLIX, nº 195. VV.AA.. Caracas, 1966. http://www.diccionariomadoz.com/valdelaguna/Madrid/

Municipalities in the Community of Madrid